Yu Gu is a Canadian-American filmmaker with a focus on the individual's relationship to society. Her film A Woman's Work: The NFL's Cheerleader Problem debuted at Tribeca in 2019.

Yu was born in Chongqing and raised in Vancouver. She became interested in the story of Lacy Thibodeaux-Fields after reading about her case in the LA Times. Thibodeaux-Fields, a cheerleader with the Los Angeles Raiders, had hired Oakland employment attorney Sharon Vinick to check her contract. Vinick is quoted in the film: "There are more provisions in here that are illegal then any contract I know of. After filing a class action suit against her employer, Thibodeaux-Fields' case made the news.

Yu got to know American football culture during her life as a student in California. She was shocked to learn about the gender pay gap the cheerleaders experienced, and met Thibodeaux-Fields and her attorney initially with the idea of making a film about Thibodeaux-Fields while following the progression of the case. She said, "In the beginning I thought this was just going to be about one woman". During the next four years, the case and the film took a different direction.

References

External links
 

Living people
People from Chongqing
Year of birth missing (living people)
American documentary film producers
American women film producers
American documentary film directors
American women film directors
Canadian documentary film producers
Canadian women film producers
Canadian documentary film directors
Canadian women film directors
Asian-Canadian filmmakers
American women documentary filmmakers
Canadian women documentary filmmakers